John Irwin (born 31 May 1969, Doncaster), known as Jon Jo Irwin, is a retired English amateur featherweight and professional feather/super featherweight boxer of the 1990s.

Boxing career

Amateur
As an amateur he represented England and won a gold medal in the -57 kg featherweight division, at the 1990 Commonwealth Games in Auckland, New Zealand.

He also won the prestigious 1991 ABA featherweight championship, against Mark Bowers (Pinewood Starr ABC (Crowthorne), boxing out of Tom Hill ABC (Doncaster).

Professional

References

External links

Image - Jon Jo Irwin
Article - Top boxer Jon Jo helps troubled pupils make a fist of schooldays

1969 births
Boxers at the 1990 Commonwealth Games
Commonwealth Games gold medallists for England
English male boxers
Featherweight boxers
Living people
Sportspeople from Doncaster
Super-featherweight boxers
Commonwealth Games medallists in boxing
Medallists at the 1990 Commonwealth Games